Symmes Township is one of fifteen townships in Edgar County, Illinois, USA. As of the 2010 census, its population was 1,158 and it contained 502 housing units. The township was called Marion Township until May 9, 1857.

Geography

Cities, towns, villages
 Paris (south edge)

Unincorporated towns
 Oliver

Extinct towns
 Bell Ridge

Cemeteries

 Cassady
 Chronic
 Elledge Holley
 Laufman
 Lycan
 New Hope
 O'Hair
 Ogden
 Quinn
 Stephens
 Swango
 Walls
 Zimmerly

Major highways
  Illinois Route 1

Demographics

School districts
 Paris Community Unit School District 4
 Paris-Union School District 95

Political districts
 Illinois's 15th congressional district
 State House District 109
 State Senate District 55

References
 
 US Census Bureau 2007 TIGER/Line Shapefiles
 US National Atlas

External links
 City-Data.com
 Illinois State Archives
 Edgar County Official Site

Townships in Edgar County, Illinois
Townships in Illinois
1856 establishments in Illinois
Populated places established in 1856